is an unstaffed railway station in Akabira, Hokkaidō, Japan. It is served by local and rapid trains running on the Furano to Takikawa section of JR Hokkaido's Nemuro Main Line. The station code is T24.

First opened as a coal-handling facility on 28 December 1918, Moshiri became a full passenger station on 15 July 1926. The facilities today consist of a double-sided island platform connected by a pedestrian overbridge to a station building located on the northern side of the line.

Notes

Railway stations in Hokkaido Prefecture
Stations of Hokkaido Railway Company
Railway stations in Japan opened in 1926